Doros profuges is a Palearctic species of hoverfly.

Description
External images
For terms see Morphology of Diptera

The wing length is 11·25-13·25 mm. Large fly resembling a wasp. Strikingly petiolate abdomen and dark costal margin of wing. Abdomen with 3 yellow bands, thorax black with yellow
bands at the sides.
 
 
 The male genitalia are figured by Vockeroth (1969).

Distribution
Palaearctic South Fennoscandia southwards to central Spain. Ireland east through Central and South Europe and on through Russia and the Russian Far East to the Pacific coast and Japan and South into China.

Biology
Occurs particularly in woodlands, on rotten tree-trunks, and on trunks from which sap is flowing. The habitat is Oak and Ash woodland and Hazel scrub, unimproved pastures invaded by scrub (including Rubus and Yew). Arboreal and elusive. In open situations, adults fly along the edge of scrub, often around Rubus fruticosus thickets, on which they settle. Flowers visited include umbellifers, ox-eye daisy, dropwort, Rubus.

The flight period is short - from the end of May into June (July at high altitudes). The larva is believed to be an ant commensal.

References

External links
Arkive

Diptera of Europe
Syrphinae
Syrphini
Insects described in 1780